A coffeehouse is an establishment which primarily serves prepared coffee or other hot beverages.

Coffeehouse or Coffee House may also refer to:
 The Coffee House (play), a 1738 play by James Miller 
Coffee House (TV series), South Korean television series
Coffeehouse (event), a social event, often held to raise funds for or generate awareness of a cause, which generally serves coffee
The Coffee House (Sirius XM), a Sirius XM Radio station
The Coffee House (coffeehouse chain), a Vietnamese coffee house chain
Kofe Khauz, (Кофе Хауз or Coffee House), a chain of coffeehouses in Russia
Coffeehousing at bridge or whist, making improper remarks with the aim of gaining an unfair advantage
Coffee House Press, an American publisher

See also
 Cafe (disambiguation)
 Coffee shop (disambiguation)